Tropical Albums (formerly known as Tropical/Salsa) is a record chart published by Billboard magazine. Established in June 1985, the chart compiles information about the top-selling albums in genres like salsa, merengue, bachata, cumbia, and vallenato, which are frequently considered tropical music. The chart features only full-length albums and, like all Billboard album charts, is based on sales. The information is compiled by Nielsen SoundScan from a sample representing more than 90% of the U.S. music retail market, including not only music stores and music departments at electronics and department stores but also direct-to-consumer transactions and Internet sales (both physical albums and digital downloads). A limited number of verifiable sales at concert venues is also tabulated. Innovations by El Gran Combo de Puerto Rico was the first album to reach number-one in the chart. Up until May 21, 2005, reggaeton albums appeared on the chart. After the installation of the Latin Rhythm Albums chart, reggaeton titles could no longer appear on the Tropical Albums chart. By removing reggaeton albums from the Tropical Albums chart, it opened slots for re-entries and debuts. American bachata group Aventura claimed the top spot on the Tropical Albums chart, which marked the first time since the issue dated November 6, 2004 that a reggaeton album was not at the number-one spot.

The current number-one album, as of the March 18, 2023 issue is Todavia Me Amas: Lo Mejor de Aventura by Aventura.

Chart achievements

Artist with the most number-ones
Gilberto Santa Rosa (12)
Víctor Manuelle (12)
Marc Anthony (7)
El Gran Combo de Puerto Rico (6)
Eddie Santiago (6)
La India (6)
Prince Royce (6)
Romeo Santos (6)
Aventura (5)
Jerry Rivera (5)
Juan Luis Guerra (5)
Luis Enrique (5)
Frankie Ruiz (4)
Gloria Estefan (4)

Year-end best selling albums
According to the RIAA, albums containing more than 50% Spanish language content are awarded with gold certifications (Disco de Oro) for U.S. shipments of 100,000 units; platinum (Disco de Platino) for 200,000 and multi-platinum (Multi-Platino) for 400,000 and following in increments of 200,000 thereafter.

See also
List of Caribbean music genres

References
General

 NOTE: Tropical Albums prior to 2004 are listed under the "Tropical Songs" chart.

Specific

External links
 Official Billboard website

Billboard charts
Tropical music albums